The Tykakh (Tıkaax) is a river in the Sakha Republic (Yakutia), Russia. It is a tributary of the Yana.

The river flows just north of the Arctic Circle and there are no settlements near its course. Its basin falls within Verkhoyansky District.

Course
The Tykakh is a left tributary of the Yana. It has its sources at the confluence of the Arga-Sala and Ilin-Sala —both having a length of — at the edge of the northwestern part of the Yana Plateau, near the southeastern end of the Kular Range of the Verkhoyansk system. The river flows first northeastwards, bending in a wide arch roughly in mid-course and then heading southeastwards within the mountain area. Towards the end it meanders heading in an eastern direction in its last stretch, where the river enters a swampy area with lakes. Finally it meets the left bank of the Yana  from its mouth. The nearest inhabited place is Batagay, located upstream from its confluence with the Yana

Tributaries 
There are 200 lakes in the river basin. The river is frozen between early October and late May or early June.

See also
List of rivers of Russia

References

External links 
Fishing & Tourism in Yakutia

Tributaries of the Yana River
Rivers of the Sakha Republic
Verkhoyansk Range